The Canon EOS 300 (EOS Kiss III in Japan, EOS Rebel 2000 in North America)
is a consumer-level 35mm single-lens reflex camera, produced by Canon of Japan from April 1999 until September 2002 as part of their EOS system.
Designed under the supervision of Yasuhiro Morishita, the camera was intended as a replacement for the Canon EOS 500N.  The camera was a success for Canon, selling exceedingly well and dominating its market sector until it was replaced by the EOS 300V (Rebel Ti, Kiss 5).
Canon EOS 300 won European Imaging and Sound Association Award 1999-2000.
Like other low-priced SLRs of the time, the EOS 300 used a pentamirror viewfinder instead of a pentaprism, and had a polycarbonate body.

The autofocus capabilities of this camera were identical to Canon's much more expensive Elan 7 with six single-line CMOS sensors surrounding a central cross-type sensor.

The EOS 300 should not be confused with the later Canon EOS 300D (EOS Digital Rebel in the US and EOS Kiss Digital in Japan), a popular entry-level digital SLR from 2003.

References

External links

300